This is a list of airlines currently operating in Palau.

See also
 List of airlines
 List of defunct airlines of Oceania

 
Palau
Palau

Airlines
Airlines